Jakob Hlasek was the defending champion, but lost in the first round to Jonas Svensson.

Boris Becker won the title by defeating Petr Korda 3–6, 6–3, 6–2, 6–4 in the final.

Seeds

Draw

Finals

Top half

Bottom half

References

External links
 Official results archive (ATP)
 Official results archive (ITF)

1992 ATP Tour